Richard Edward Erle-Drax-Grosvenor (c. March 1797 – 18 August 1828), was a British politician.

A member of the Grosvenor family now headed by the Duke of Westminster, he was the son of Richard Erle-Drax-Grosvenor and Sarah Frances, daughter of Edward Drax, of Charborough House, Dorset. On his father's death in 1819 he succeeded him as Member of Parliament for New Romney, a seat he held until 1826.

Erle-Drax-Grosvenor inherited Charborough House through his mother. He died unmarried in August 1828, aged only 31. His sister Jane Frances Erle-Drax-Grosvenor inherited the estate. She married John Sawbridge, who assumed the surname of Erle-Drax in lieu of his patronymic.

References

External links 
 

1797 births
1828 deaths
Richard
UK MPs 1818–1820
UK MPs 1820–1826
Members of the Parliament of the United Kingdom for English constituencies
Ernle family